The Washington State University Cougar Marching Band (or CMB) is the marching band of Washington State University.  With over 180 members, the Cougar Marching Band performs at every home football game and select away games.

The CMB hosts a Band Day and a Marching Band Competition. The latter was started in 2015 to give high school bands in the region a premiere competitive event.

Directors

Band Composition

Instrumentation 
Piccolos
Clarinets
Alto Saxophones
Tenor Saxophones
Trumpets
Mellophones
Trombones
Baritones
Sousaphones
Snares
Tenors
Basses
Cymbals

Color Guard 

 Flags
 Rifles

Feature Twirler 
The feature twirler is an auditioned role. They perform alongside the band during all events on game day.

Repertoire

"The Fight Song" 
"The Fight Song" is the fight song of the university. The music was composed in 1919 by WSU student Phyllis Sayles with fellow student Zella Melcher penning the lyrics. In 2019, the CMB celebrated the 100th anniversary of the fight song by premiering a new version titled "Win the Day". It retains the same structure as the original, with modernized composition. It is now that standard version of the fight used by the band.

The Alma Mater 
"Washington, My Washington" is the alma mater of the university. It was composed by James DeForest Cline in 1914 for a pep contest, and was adopted by the university in 1919 to be the alma mater. The version in use currently is an arrangement by current CMB director, Troy Bennefield.

Other common tunes 
The CMB plays many songs and "shorts" to get the crowd excited. The most common are:

 "Seven Nation Army"
 "The Hey Song"
 "Land of 1000 Dances"
 "Louie Louie"
 "Right Above It"
 "Light 'Em Up"
 "Fire"
 First Down Cheer (Superman Theme)
 "Jaws"
 Fourth Down Taunt (The Batman Theme)
 "Goons"
 Wonder Woman Theme (2017)
 "Mic Drop"
 "Sucker"
 "Word Up"
 "Confident"
 "2 Points"
 "Invasion! (Goldberg's Theme)"

WSU Marching Band Championships 
The WSU Marching Band Championships is an independent, annual high school marching band competition hosted by the CMB. Bands from primarily Eastern Washington and Northern Idaho compete in the modern two-round competition format, prelims and finals. The festival is coordinated by the CMB, and was started in 2015 to serve high school marching bands in the region. The CMB performs as an exhibition group at this event.

Former Members
Dolph Lundgren
Mahlon Merrick (composer and film actor)

See also
 WSU School of Music
 Crimson Company

College marching bands in the United States
Pac-12 Conference marching bands
Washington State Cougars
Musical groups established in 1899
1899 establishments in Washington (state)